Vince Murdocco (born 1966) is a Canadian actor, stunt performer, and former kickboxer. He won a North American Cruiserweight Kickboxing Championship in 1990.

Filmography

Film

Stunt performer

References

External links
 Official website

1966 births
Living people
Canadian male kickboxers
Cruiserweight kickboxers
Canadian male television actors
Canadian male film actors
Canadian stunt performers
Male actors from Montreal
Sportspeople from Montreal